BMC Systems Biology was an open access peer-reviewed scientific journal that covered research in systems biology. Filling a gap in what was a new research field, the journal was established in 2007 and is published by BioMed Central. Part of the BMC Series of journals, it had a broad scope covering the engineering of biological systems, network modelling, quantitative analyses, integration of different levels of information and synthetic biology. In January 2019 the Editorial Board was informed that the journal was closing and no more submissions would be accepted after March 1. The last articles were published on 5 April 2019, but content is still archived in perpetuity from the homepage and PubMed Central.

See also
Systems and Synthetic Biology (until 2015)

References

BioMed Central academic journals
Systems biology
Publications established in 2007
English-language journals
Creative Commons Attribution-licensed journals